Akçakale can refer to:

 Akçakale
 Akçakale, Çıldır
 Akçakale, Ergani
 Akçakale, Elâzığ
 Akcakale, Trabzon
 Akçakale tower